Gisclareny is a municipality in the comarca of Berguedà, Catalonia, located in Cadí-Moixeró Natural Park.
2018 it again became the smallest village in Catalonia after the village of Sant Jaume de Frontanyà grew by 3 families.
The altitude of the inhabited space varies between 800 meters in the neighborhood of Bagà and 1430 in the neighborhood of Coll de la Bena. It is bounded on the north by the Cerdanya, reaching the peaks of the Serra del Cadí, and by Bagà, on the south and west by Saldes and Vallcebre, and on the east by Bagà and Guardiola de Berguedà. The alpine forests and meadows are the usual landscape of the municipality as well as a multitude of farmhouses scattered throughout the territory.

Economy 
Agriculture is the mainstay of Gisclarany's economy, and in particular dryland farming and animal husbandry.

Sites of interest 

 Sites of interest list

References

External links 
Town website
 Government data pages 

Municipalities in Berguedà